Karlsruhe University of Education is an institution of higher education in Karlsruhe, Germany. Its focus is on educational processes in social, institutional and cultural contexts. It has approximately 3,742 students, 180 researchers and lecturers and about 90 administrative staff members.

History 
The university was established in 1962, although teacher training can be traced back to 1757.

Region 
Karlsruhe offers many cultural events, especially the ZKM Center for Art and Media Karlsruhe, which is well known for its art events.

The Karlsruhe campus 
The campus of Karlsruhe University of Education is located near the center of Karlsruhe. There are three buildings on the main campus and another near the Cooperative State University Karlsruhe.

Studies 
The University of Education Karlsruhe offers a wide range of programs, especially for students to become qualified for educational professions such as: 
 Teaching profession at primary schools and secondary schools
Bachelor Program
Early Childhood Education  
 Master Program
Educational Science  
 Intercultural Education
 Migration and Multilingualism
 Biodiversity and Environmental Education

Faculties

Faculty I – Humanities 
 Institute of Educational Studies and History of Education
 Institute of Educational Studies with a Focus on Extra-Curricular Education
 Institute of Early Childhood Education
 Institute of School and Education Development for Primary and Secondary Schools
 Institute of Psychology
 Institute of Philosophy
 Institute of Catholic Theology
 Institute of Protestant Theology
 Institute of Islamic Theology

Faculty II – Languages and Literature Studies and Social Sciences 
 Institute of German Philology and Literature
 Institute of Multilingualism
 Institute of Economics and its Didactics
 Institutes of Political Science
 Institute of Trans-disciplinary Social Sciences

Faculty III – Natural Sciences, Cultural Studies, Mathematics and Sports 
 Institute of Culture of Daily Life and Health
 Institute of Physical Education and Sports
 Institute of Mathematics and Computer Science
 Institute of Biology and School Gardening
 Institute of Chemistry
 Institute of Physics and Technical Education
 Institute of Art
 Institute of Music

References

External links 

Universities and colleges in Karlsruhe
Education schools in Germany